Artas is a commune in the Isère department in the Auvergne-Rhône-Alpes region of south-eastern France.

The inhabitants of the commune are known as Artasiens or Artasiennes

Geography
Artas is located some 20 km east by north-east of Vienne and some 8 km south of Villefontaine. Access to the commune is by the D53 road from Charantonnay in the west passing through the heart of the commune and the village and continuing to Saint-Agnin-sur-Bion in the east. The D126 road comes from Roche in the north through the heart of the commune and crossing the D53 in the village before continuing to Saint-Jean-de-Bournay in the south. Apart from the village there are also the hamlets of Le Barroz, Le Revolet, Cinquin, Radoire, Tarnezieux, and La Petite-Foret. The commune is mainly farmland with scattered forests throughout.

The Ruisseau de Charavoux rises in the west of the commune and flows west to join the Ambalon near Chasse-sur-Rhône.

Neighbouring communes and villages

History
In the reign of Louis XIV the Oak trees from the Artas Forest provided a large part of the wood needed to build the King's Galleys at Marseille.

Artas was the birthplace of Mother's Day in France on 10 June 1906 - two years earlier than the date of origin of 1908 claimed by the USA.

Administration

List of Successive Mayors

Demography
In 2017 the commune had 1,809 inhabitants.

Sites and monuments

A Church with two bell towers from the 12th and 19th centuries.

Artas Picture Gallery

See also
Communes of the Isère department

References

External links
Artas official website 
Artas on the National Geographic Institute website 
Artas on Géoportail, National Geographic Institute (IGN) website 
Artas on the 1750 Cassini Map

Communes of Isère
Dauphiné